Denis Mast (born 4 March 1941) is a Swiss cross-country skier. He competed in the men's 30 kilometre event at the 1968 Winter Olympics.

References

External links
 

1941 births
Living people
Swiss male cross-country skiers
Olympic cross-country skiers of Switzerland
Cross-country skiers at the 1968 Winter Olympics
Sportspeople from the canton of Neuchâtel